Wurmbea pygmaea, also known as One-flower Nancy, is a species of plant in the Colchicaceae family that is endemic to Australia.

Description
The species is a cormous perennial herb that grows to a height of 4–17 cm. Its solitary white flower appears in spring.

Distribution and habitat
The species is found in south-eastern Australia in New South Wales, South Australia, Victoria and Tasmania. It grows in marshy places.

References

uniflora
Monocots of Australia
Flora of New South Wales
Flora of South Australia
Flora of Tasmania
Flora of Victoria (Australia)
Plants described in 1810
Taxa named by Robert Brown (botanist, born 1773)
Taxa named by Terry Desmond Macfarlane